Agustina Lepore (born 8 September 1988) is a retired Argentine tennis player.

In her career, Lepore won six singles and ten doubles titles on the ITF circuit. On 13 July 2009, she reached her career-high singles ranking of world No. 227. On 7 July 2008, she peaked at No. 239 in the doubles rankings.

Partnering Anikó Kapros, Lepore won her first $50,000 tournament in September 2009 at the Red Rock Pro Open, defeating Kimberly Couts and Lindsay Lee-Waters in the final.

ITF finals

Singles: 11 (6–5)

Doubles: 20 (10–10)

External links

 
 

1988 births
Living people
Argentine female tennis players
People from San Martín Department, Santa Fe
Sportspeople from Santa Fe Province
20th-century Argentine women
21st-century Argentine women